Wolf is an unincorporated community in Tuscarawas County, in the U.S. state of Ohio.

History
An old variant name was Wolfs Station. Wolf's Station was laid out in 1874 by Enoch G. Wolf, and named for him. A post office called Wolfs Station was established in 1874, the name was changed to Wolf in 1882, and the post office closed in 1940. Besides the post office, Wolf had a station on the Cleveland and Marietta Railroad.

References

Unincorporated communities in Tuscarawas County, Ohio
Unincorporated communities in Ohio